Minuscule 484 (in the Gregory-Aland numbering), ε 322 (in the Soden numbering), is a Greek minuscule manuscript of the New Testament, on thick cotton paper (charta Damascena). It is dated by a Colophon to the year 1291/1292.

The manuscript was prepared for liturgical use. It contains liturgical books. Scrivener labelled it by number 571. The manuscript has complex contents.

Description 

The codex contains the complete text of the four Gospels on 258 thick paper leaves (size ). The leaves are arranged in octavo (eight leaves in quire). It is written in one column per page, 23-25 lines per page.
In some parts the text is almost illegible.

There is also a division according to the Ammonian Sections (in Mark 234 sections, the last section in 16:9), but without references to the Eusebian Canons.

It is a fine copy, but much damaged.

Text 

The Greek text of the codex is a representative of the Byzantine text-type. Aland placed it in Category V.
According to the Claremont Profile Method it represents to the textual family Family Kx in Luke 1, Luke 10, and Luke 20. It belongs to the textual cluster 74. According to Scrivener it is different from the codex 483 — written by the same scribe — only in 183 places (errors of itacisms excluded).

The manuscript has several remarkable and unusual readings — from the point of view Textus Receptus — such as in Matthew 9:22; 18:30; 20:6; Mark 3:32; 5:22; 11:26; 12:12.

History 

According to the colophon on folio 258, the manuscript was written by monk Theodoros Hagiographita in the 6800 year from creation of the world, it means in 1292 CE in Thessalonica, monastery of Philokalos. According to the note from 14th century on folio 8 verso, it was presented by monk Dositheos, son of the grammaticus Demetrios of Thessalonica, to the archon Alexios. Giovanni Saibante, of Verona, was its owner in the first half of the 18th century.

It once belonged to Charles Burney, as codices 480, 481, 482, 485, and ℓ 184. It was purchased to the British Museum in 1818.

The manuscript was examined and collated by Scrivener, who published its text in 1852. The manuscript was added to the list of New Testament manuscripts by Scrivener (571) and Gregory (484). Scrivener collated its text. It was examined by Henri Omont.

It is currently housed at the British Library (Burney MS 21) in London.

See also 

 List of New Testament minuscules
 Biblical manuscript
 Textual criticism

References

Further reading 

  (as r)
 Henri Omont, Notes sur les manuscrits grecs du British Museum, Bibliothèque de l’École des Chartes, 45 (1884), pp. 344, 349.

External links 

 Codex Burney 21 at the British Library

Greek New Testament minuscules
13th-century biblical manuscripts
Burney Collection